The 1894 Washington & Jefferson football team was an American football team that represented Washington & Jefferson College as an independent during the 1894 college football season. Led by first-year head coach E. Gard Edwards, the team compiled a record of 5–2–1.

Schedule

References

Washington and Jefferson
Washington & Jefferson Presidents football seasons
Washington and Jefferson football